The 38th annual Toronto International Film Festival (TIFF) took place in Toronto, Ontario, Canada between September 5 and 15, 2013. The Fifth Estate was selected as the opening film and Life of Crime was the closing film. 75 films were added to the festival line-up in August. A total of 366 films from 70 countries were screened, including 146 world premieres.

Awards

Programmes

Gala Presentations
American Dreams in China by Peter Chan
The Art of the Steal by Jonathan Sobol
August: Osage County by John Wells
Blood Ties by Guillaume Canet
Bright Days Ahead by Marion Vernoux
Cold Eyes by Cho Ui-seok and Kim Byeong-seo
The Fifth Estate by Bill Condon
The Grand Seduction by Don McKellar
Kill Your Darlings by John Krokidas
Life of Crime by Daniel Schechter
The Love Punch by Joel Hopkins
The Lunchbox by Ritesh Batra
Mandela: Long Walk to Freedom by Justin Chadwick
Parkland by Peter Landesman
The Railway Man by Jonathan Teplitzky
The Right Kind of Wrong by Jeremiah S. Chechik
Rush by Ron Howard
Shuddh Desi Romance (English title: A Random Desi Romance) by Maneesh Sharma
Supermensch: The Legend of Shep Gordon by Mike Myers
Words and Pictures by Fred Schepisi

Special Presentations
12 Years a Slave by Steve McQueen
All Is by My Side by John Ridley
The Armstrong Lie by Alex Gibney
Attila Marcel by Sylvain Chomet
Bad Words by Jason Bateman
Belle by Amma Asante 
Blind Detective by Johnnie To
Blue Is the Warmest Colour by Abdellatif Kechiche
Burning Bush by Agnieszka Holland
Can a Song Save Your Life? by John Carney
Caníbal by Manuel Martín Cuenca
Child of God by James Franco
Dallas Buyers Club by Jean-Marc Vallée
Devil's Knot by Atom Egoyan 
The Disappearance of Eleanor Rigby by Ned Benson
Dom Hemingway by Richard Shepard
Don Jon by Joseph Gordon-Levitt
The Double by Richard Ayoade
Enemy by Denis Villeneuve
Enough Said by Nicole Holofcener
Exit Marrakech by Caroline Link
The F Word by Michael Dowse
The Face of Love by Arie Posin
Fading Gigolo by John Turturro
Felony by Matthew Saville
The Finishers by Nils Tavernier
For Those Who Can Tell No Tales by Jasmila Žbanić
Gabrielle by Louise Archambault
Gloria by Sebastián Lelio
Going Away by Nicole Garcia
Gravity by Alfonso Cuarón
The Great Beauty by Paolo Sorrentino
Half of a Yellow Sun by Biyi Bandele
Hateship, Loveship by Liza Johnson
How I Live Now by Kevin Macdonald
The Husband by Bruce McDonald
Ida by Paweł Pawlikowski
L'intrepido by Gianni Amelio
The Invisible Woman by Ralph Fiennes
Joe by David Gordon Green
Labor Day by Jason Reitman
The Last of Robin Hood by Richard Glatzer, Wash Westmoreland
The Liberator by Alberto Arvelo
Like Father, Like Son by Hirokazu Koreeda
Love Is the Perfect Crime by Arnaud Larrieu, Jean-Marie Larrieu
Lucky Them by Megan Griffiths
Man of Tai Chi by Keanu Reeves
Mary Queen of Scots by Thomas Imbach
Mystery Road by Ivan Sen
Night Moves by Kelly Reichardt
Omar by Hany Abu-Assad
One Chance by David Frankel
Only Lovers Left Alive by Jim Jarmusch
The Past by Asghar Farhadi
Philomena by Stephen Frears
Pioneer by Erik Skjoldbjærg
Prisoners by Denis Villeneuve
A Promise by Patrice Leconte
Quai d'Orsay by Bertrand Tavernier
Real by Kiyoshi Kurosawa
Rock the Casbah by Laïla Marrakchi
Singing Women by Reha Erdem
Southcliffe by Sean Durkin
Starred Up by David Mackenzie
Sunshine on Leith by Dexter Fletcher
Therese by Charlie Stratton
Third Person by Paul Haggis
Those Happy Years by Daniele Luchetti
Tom at the Farm by Xavier Dolan
Tracks by John Curran
Under the Skin by Jonathan Glazer
Unforgiven by Lee Sang-il
Violette by Martin Provost
Visitors by Godfrey Reggio
Walesa. Man of Hope by Andrzej Wajda
Watermark by Jennifer Baichwal, Edward Burtynsky
We Are the Best! by Lukas Moodysson
Le Week-End by Roger Michell
The Wind Rises by Hayao Miyazaki
You Are Here by Matthew Weiner
Young & Beautiful by François Ozon

Mavericks
12.12.12. by Thom Powers
For No Good Reason by Charlie Paul
I Am Somebody by Madeline Anderson
In Conversation With...Irrfan Khan by Cameron Bailey
In Conversation With...Spike Jonze by Cameron Bailey
InRealLife by Beeban Kidron 
Made in America by Ron Howard
Our Man in Tehran by Larry Weinstein and Drew Taylor
What is Cinema? by Chuck Workman

Documentaries
Un Voyageur by Marcel Ophüls
At Berkeley by Frederick Wiseman
Beyond the Edge by Leanne Pooley
Burt's Buzz by Jody Shapiro
The Dark Matter of Love by Sarah McCarthy
The Dog by Allison Berg and Frank Keraudren
Faith Connections by Pan Nalin
Filthy Gorgeous: The World of Bob Guccione by Barry Avrich
Finding Vivian Maier by John Maloof and Charlie Siskel
Hi-Ho Mistahey! by Alanis Obomsawin. 
Ignasi M. by Ventura Pons
Jodorowsky's Dune by Frank Pavich
Le Dernier des injustes by Claude Lanzmann
El Alcalde by Emiliano Altuna Fistolera
Midway by Chris Jordan
Mission Congo by David Turner and Lara Zizic
The Square (Al-Midan) by Jehane Noujaim
A Story of Children and Film by Mark Cousins
Tim's Vermeer by Teller
The Unknown Known by Errol Morris
Unstable Elements by Madeleine Sackler
When Jews Were Funny by Alan Zweig

Midnight Madness
Afflicted by Derek Lee and Clif Prowse
All Cheerleaders Die by Lucky McKee and Chris Sivertson
Almost Human by Joe Begos
The Green Inferno by Eli Roth
Oculus by Mike Flanagan
R100 by Hitoshi Matsumoto
Rigor Mortis by Juno Mak
Blutgletscher by Marvin Kren
Why Don't You Play in Hell? by Sion Sono
Witching and Bitching by Álex de la Iglesia

Vanguard
Asphalt Watches by Shayne Ehman and Seth Scriver
Blue Ruin by Jeremy Saulnier
Borgman by Alex van Warmerdam
Celestial Wives of the Meadow Mari by Aleksei Fedorchenko
The Fake by Yeon Sang-ho
Gerontophilia by Bruce LaBruce
Horns by Alexandre Aja
People In Places by Juan Cavestany
Proxy by Zack Parker
The Sacrament by Ti West
Sapi by Brillante Mendoza
Sex, Drugs & Taxation by Christoffer Boe
Soul by Chung Mong-Hong
The Strange Colour of Your Body's Tears by Hélène Cattet and Bruno Forzani
Thou Gild'st the Even by Onur Ünlü
We Gotta Get Out of This Place by Simon Hawkins and Zeke Hawkins

Contemporary World Cinema
The Animal Project by Ingrid Veninger
Bad Hair by Mariana Rondón
Bastardo by Nejib Belkadhi
Berea by Vincent Moloi
The Bit Player by Jeffrey Jeturian
Blind Dates by Levan Koguashvili
Brazilian Western by René Sampaio
Break Loose by Alexei Uchitel
Child's Pose by Călin Peter Netzer
Cinemanovels by Terry Miles
Club Sandwich by Fernando Eimbcke
Cristo Rey by Leticia Tonos
The Dick Knost Show by Bruce Sweeney
The Dinner by Menno Meyjes
Eastern Boys by Robin Campillo
El Mudo by Diego Vega, Daniel Vega
Empire of Dirt by Peter Stebbings
An Episode in the Life of an Iron Picker by Danis Tanović
Friends from France by Anne Weil, Philippe Kotlarski
Giselle by Toa Fraser
Le Grand Cahier by János Szász
Heart of a Lion by Dome Karukoski
Homecoming by Jim Chuchu
Honeymoon by Jan Hřebejk
Hotell by Lisa Langseth
The Immoral by Lars Daniel Krutzkoff Jacobsen
Intruders by Noh Young-seok
iNumber Number by Donovan Marsh
The Kids from the Port by Alberto Morais
Kwaku Ananse by Akosua Adoma Owusu
Ladder to Damascus by Mohammad Malas
Le Démantèlement by Sébastien Pilote
Life's a Breeze by Lance Daly
Little Feet by Alexandre Rockwell
The Major by Yuri Bykov
Manuscripts Don't Burn by Mohammad Rasoulof
McCanick by Josh C. Waller
Metalhead by Ragnar Bragason
Ningen by Guillaume Giovanetti, Cagla Zencirci
Noye's Fludde by Mark Dornford-May
October November by Götz Spielmann
Old Moon by Raisa Bonnet
Palestine Stereo by Rashid Masharawi
Paradise: Hope by Ulrich Seidl
A Place in Heaven by Yossi Madmoni
Qissa by Anup Singh
Rags and Tatters by Ahmad Abdalla
The Sea by Stephen Brown
The Selfish Giant by Clio Barnard
Siddharth by Richie Mehta
Something Necessary by Judy Kibinge
Stay by Wiebke von Carolsfeld
Stop the Pounding Heart by Roberto Minervini
Stranger by the Lake by Alain Guiraudie
This Is Sanlitun by Róbert Ingi Douglas
To Repel Ghosts by Philippe Lacôte
Unbeatable by Dante Lam
Under the Starry Sky by Dyana Gaye
A Journey by Catherine Martin
When Evening Falls on Bucharest or Metabolism by Corneliu Porumboiu
White Lies by Dana Rotberg
A Wolf at the Door by Fernando Coimbra
The Wonders by Avi Nesher

Contemporary World Speakers
Cristo Rey by Leticia Tonos
Qissa by Anup Singh
The Wonders by Avi Nesher

Masters
Abuse of Weakness by Catherine Breillat
Bastards by Claire Denis
Closed Curtain by Jafar Panahi and Kambuzia Partovi
Concrete Night by Pirjo Honkasalo
Home From Home - Chronicle of a Vision by Edgar Reitz
How Strange to be Named Federico: Scola narrates Fellini by Ettore Scola
Moebius by Kim Ki-duk
Norte, the End of History by Lav Diaz
Our Sunhi by Hong Sang-soo
A Touch of Sin by Jia Zhangke
Triptych (Triptyque) by Robert Lepage and Pedro Pires

City to City: Athens
The Daughter by Thanos Anastopoulos
The Eternal Return of Antonis Paraskevas by 
J.A.C.E. - Just Another Confused Elephant by Menelaos Karamaghiolis
Miss Violence by Alexandros Avranas
September by Penny Panayotopoulou
Standing Aside, Watching by Yorgos Servetas
To the Wolf by Aran Hughes and Christina Koutsospyrou
Unfair World by Filippos Tsitos
Wasted Youth by Argyris Papadimitropoulos and Jan Vogel
Wild Duck by Yannis Sakaridis

Discovery
1982 by Tommy Oliver
All About the Feathers by Neto Villalobos
The Amazing Catfish by Claudia Sainte-Luce
All the Wrong Reasons by Gia Milani
Around the Block by Sarah Spillane
Bends by Flora Lau
Beneath the Harvest Sky by Aron Gaudet and Gita Pullapilly
Bethlehem by Yuval Adler
Bobô by Inês Oliveira
Border by Alessio Cremonini
Canopy by Aaron Wilson
Fat by Mark Phinney
Giraffada by Rani Massalha
I Am Yours by Iram Haq
Ilo Ilo by Anthony Chen
The Militant by Manolo Nieto
Miracle by Juraj Lehotský
My Love Awaits Me by the Sea by Mais Darwazah
Of Good Report by Jahmil X.T. Qubeka
Rhymes for Young Ghouls by Jeff Barnaby
Palo Alto by Gia Coppola
Paraíso by Mariana Chenillo
Sarah Prefers to Run by Chloé Robichaud
Salvation Army by Abdellah Taïa
South is Nothing by Fabio Mollo
The Stag by John Butler
The Summer of Flying Fish by Marcela Said
Trap Street by Vivian Qu

Short Cuts Canada
Anatomy of Assistance by Cory Bowles
Beasts in the Real World by Sol Friedman
Candy by Cassandra Cronenberg
The Chaperone 3D by Fraser Munden and Neil Rathbone
Cochemare by Chris Lavis and Maciek Szczerbowski
CRIME: Joe Loya - The Beirut Bandit by Alix Lambert and Sam Chou
Daybreak (Éclat du jour) by Ian Lagarde
Destroyer by Kevan Funk
Der Untermensch by Kays Mejri
Drop by Chris Goldade
The End of Pinky by Claire Blanchet
An Extraordinary Person (Quelqu'un d'extraordinaire) by Monia Chokri
Firecrackers by Jasmin Mozaffari
Foreclosure by Wayne Robinson
Gloria Victoria by Theodore Ushev
A Grand Canal by Johnny Ma
Impromptu by Bruce Alcock
In Guns We Trust by Nicolas Lévesque
Jimbo by Ryan Flowers
Lay Over by Jordan Hayes
Method by Gregory Smith
Noah by Patrick Cederberg and Walter Woodman
Numbers & Friends by Alexander Carson
Out by Jeremy Lalonde
Paradise Falls by Fantavious Fritz
Paradiso by Devan Scott
Pilgrims by Marie Clements
Portrait as a Random Act of Violence by Randall Okita
Relax, I'm from the Future by Luke Higginson
Remember Me (Mémorable moi) by Jean-Francois Asselin
Roland by Trevor Cornish
Sam's Formalwear by Yael Staav
Seasick by Eva Cvijanovic
The Sparkling River by Felix Lajeunesse and Paul Raphaël
Subconscious Password by Chris Landreth
A Time is a Terrible Thing to Waste by Leslie Supnet
Time Flies (Nous avions) by Stéphane Moukarzel
We Wanted More by Stephen Dunn
Yellowhead by Kevan Funk
Young Wonder by James Wilkes

Wavelengths
A Thousand Suns and Letter to a Refusing Pilot by Mati Diop and Akram Zaatari
Airships by Kenneth Anger
Bann by Nina Könnemann
A Batalha de Tabatô by Joao Viana
Brimstone Line by Chris Kennedy
Konstellationen by Helga Fanderl
Un Conte de Michel Montaigne by Jean-Marie Straub
The Disquiet by Ali Cherri
Dry Standpipe by Wojciech Bakowski
El Adios Largos by Andrew Lampert
Farther Than the Eye Can See by Basma Alsharif
A Field in England by Ben Wheatley
Flower by Naoko Tasaka
Gowanus Canal by Sarah J. Christman
I'm the same I'm an other by Caroline Strubbe
Instants by Hannes Schüpbach
La última película by Raya Martin and Mark Peranson
Le Conte de Michel de Montaigne and The King's Body and Redemption by Jean-Marie Straub, João Pedro Rodrigues and Miguel Gomes
Letter to a Refusing Pilot by Akram Zaatari
Listening to the Space in my Room by Robert Beavers
Main Hall by Philipp Fleischmann
Homme en Mouvement, 2012 by Christophe M. Saber, Ruben Glauser and Max Idje
Manakamana by Stephanie Spray and Pacho Velez
L'image manquante by Rithy Panh
Mount Song by Shambhavi Kaul
Natpwe, le festin des esprits by Tiane Doan na Champassak and Jean Dubrel
Nefandus by Carlos Motta
Pays Barbare by Angela Ricci Lucchi and Yervant Gianikian
Pepper's Ghost by Stephen Broomer
The Police Officer's Wife by Philip Gröning
Pop Takes by Luther Price
The Realist by Scott Stark
Redemption by Miguel Gomes
RP31 by Lucy Raven
La última película by Raya Martin and Mark Peranson
Song by Nathaniel Dorsky
A Spell to Ward Off the Darkness by Ben Russell
Spring by Nathaniel Dorsky
Historia de la meva mort by Albert Serra
Das merkwürdige Kätzchen by Ramon Zürcher
Stray Dogs by Tsai Ming Liang
O Corpo de Afonso by João Pedro Rodrigues
Mille Soleils by Mati Diop
Trois exercises d'interpretation by Cristi Puiu
Three Landscapes by Peter Hutton
Trissákia 3 by Nick Collins
Variations on a Cellophane Wrapper by David Rimmer

TIFF Kids
Amazonia by Thierry Ragobert
Antboy by Ask Hasselbalch
Khumba by Anthony Silverston
The Adventures of Goopy and Bagha by Shilpa Ranade
Zip & Zap and the Marble Gang by Óskar Santos
Miffy the Movie by Hans Perk

TIFF Cinematheque
An Autumn Afternoon by Yasujirō Ozu
Gun Crazy by Joseph H. Lewis
Hiroshima mon amour by Alain Resnais
Le Joli Mai by Chris Marker and Pierre Lhomme
Manila in the Claws of Light by Lino Brocka
Rome, Open City by Roberto Rossellini
Shivers by David Cronenberg

Future Projections
David Cronenberg Transformation
Grosse Fatigue by Camille Henrot
Introduction to the Memory Personality by Jeremy Shaw
Ralph Steadman For No Good Reason by Ralph Steadman
Rough Cut (Hiker Meat) by Jamie Shovlin
Swarm by James Coupe
Sweat by Radical Friend
Treatment by Candice Breitz
A Jester's Dance by Marcel Dzama
walkthrough by Laurel Woodcock

Next Wave
Around the Block by Sarah Spillane
Beneath the Harvest Sky by Aron Gaudet and Gita Pullapilly
The Finishers by Nils Tavernier
Giraffada by Rani Massalha
How I Live Now by Kevin Macdonald
Palo Alto by Gia Coppola
The Square (Al-Midan) by Jehane Noujaim
Tracks by John Curran

Manifesto
All Is by My Side by John Ridley
Belle by Amma Asante
Cristo Rey by Leticia Tonos
Empire of Dirt by Peter Stebbings
Half of a Yellow Sun by Biyi Bandele
Made in America by Ron Howard
Omar by Hany Abu-Assad
Starred Up by David Mackenzie
Supermensch: The Legend of Shep Gordon by Mike Myers
Words and Pictures by Fred Schepisi

TIFF Special Event
The Big Chill by Lawrence Kasdan
Jason Reitman's Live Read by Jason Reitman
Metallica: Through the Never by Nimród Antal
The Wizard of Oz by Victor Fleming

Canada's Top Ten
TIFF's annual Canada's Top Ten list, its national critics and festival programmers poll of the ten best feature and short films of the year, was released on December 3, 2013.

Feature films
Asphalt Watches — Shayne Ehman, Seth Scriver
Enemy — Denis Villeneuve
The F Word — Michael Dowse
Gabrielle — Louise Archambault
Rhymes for Young Ghouls — Jeff Barnaby
Sarah Prefers to Run (Sarah préfère la course) — Chloé Robichaud
Tom at the Farm (Tom à la ferme) — Xavier Dolan
Vic and Flo Saw a Bear (Vic et Flo ont vu un ours) — Denis Côté
Watermark — Jennifer Baichwal, Edward Burtynsky
When Jews Were Funny — Alan Zweig

Short films
A Grand Canal — Johnny Ma
The Chaperone 3D — Fraser Munden, Neil Rathbone
The End of Pinky — Claire Blanchet
An Extraordinary Person (Quelqu'un d'extraordinaire) — Monia Chokri
In Guns We Trust — Nicolas Lévesque
Noah — Walter Woodman, Patrick Cederberg
Paradise Falls — Fantavious Fritz
Subconscious Password — Chris Landreth
Time Flies (Nous avions) — Stéphane Moukarzel
Yellowhead — Kevan Funk

References

External links

 
 2013 Toronto International Film Festival at IMDb

2013
2013 film festivals
2013 in Toronto
2013 in Canadian cinema
2013 festivals in North America